The Malayan crestless fireback or Malay crestless fireback (Lophura erythrophthalma) is a member of the Phasianidae. It was previously known as the crestless fireback when the two species were lumped together. The Malayan crestless fireback is found in the Malay peninsula and Sumatra.

References

Gallopheasants
Birds described in 1822